Seydou Fofana (born 10 August 1993 in Bamako) is a Malian taekwondo practitioner. He won a bronze medal at the 2019 African Games in the men's –74 kg category. He  qualified to represent Mali at the 2020 Summer Olympics after qualifying at the 2020 African Taekwondo Olympic Qualification Tournament.

References

External links
 

Living people
1993 births
African Games bronze medalists for Mali
African Games medalists in taekwondo
Competitors at the 2019 African Games
Malian male taekwondo practitioners
Place of birth missing (living people)
Taekwondo practitioners at the 2020 Summer Olympics
21st-century Malian people
Olympic taekwondo practitioners of Mali